The Anne Klein Women's Prize is given by the Heinrich Böll Foundation to women from anywhere in the world who are committed to gender democracy. The award was named after Anne Klein the German lawyer and State Senator. The prize includes €10,000 and is decided on by a five-member jury. Candidates for the award come from: "Realizing gender democracy, eliminating discrimination based on gender and gender identity, political commitment to realizing women's, human and freedom rights, promoting women and girls in science and research . "

Winners

References

Awards established in 2012